Ponty may be:

Places
 Pontardawe, a town in Neath Port Talbot, Wales
 Pontypridd, a town in Rhondda Cynon Taf, Wales
 Pontypool, a town in Torfaen, Wales
 Pontefract in West Yorkshire, England is also referred to as Ponty
 Ponty Vineyards (also known as Vignobles Ponty), Bordeaux wine estate in Canon Fronsac

People
 Maurice Merleau-Ponty (1908 – 1961), a French philosopher
 Jean-Luc Ponty (b. 1942), a French musician

Other uses
 ST Ponty, a tugboat
 Pontypridd RFC, a Welsh Premiership rugby team from Rhondda Cynon Taf, Wales

See also
Pont (disambiguation)
Ponte (disambiguation)
Ponti (disambiguation)
Ponzi